Tickled is a 2016 New Zealand documentary about "competitive endurance tickling" and videos featuring it, and the practices of those producing the videos, directed by David Farrier and Dylan Reeve. The film explores possible legal and ethical issues with certain individuals making the videos, and has itself been the subject of legal challenges. A follow-up special, The Tickle King, aired on HBO in February 2017.

Synopsis
David Farrier, a New Zealand television reporter whose beat focuses on "quirky and odd stories", encounters online videos depicting "competitive endurance tickling", an activity in which young athletic men are restrained and tickled by each other. He begins to research it for a story and requests an interview with the videos' producer, Jane O'Brien Media. The company responds with a volatile email, refusing to "associate with a homosexual journalist" (although Farrier is actually bisexual). Farrier, bewildered at the hostile response, partners with television producer Dylan Reeve to dig deeper into the mysterious producers.

After their initial blog posts about the story go viral, the duo receive legal threats from Jane O'Brien Media, who send Kevin Clarke and two other representatives to New Zealand to meet with them. Although their interactions are superficially cordial, the Jane O'Brien Media representatives bully the investigators to drop the project. Farrier and Reeve respond by following the representatives to Los Angeles to an apparent video recording location, but are turned away at the door.

Researching the phenomenon further, they uncover information about a person known as "Terri DiSisto" (alias "Terri Tickle"), who pioneered recruiting and distributing tickling videos online in the 1990s. They interview independent tickling-video producer Richard Ivey, whose operations are comparatively low-key, and also acknowledge a homoerotic aspect. Former participants in Jane O'Brien Media's videos describe coercive and manipulative treatment by the producers, such as defamation campaigns against them, exposing their personal information, and contacting associates to discredit them as homosexual or as sexual deviants, all in retaliation for speaking out against the company. A local recruiter in Muskegon, Michigan, describes "audition" videos he had helped make, which were published by O'Brien Media without the participants' consent.

Farrier and Reeve discover documents on a defunct tickling video web site, which link Jane O'Brien Media to David D'Amato, the former school administrator behind the "Terri Tickle" alias. They learn that D'Amato had served a six-month prison sentence for disabling computer systems at two different universities in retaliation against an 18-year-old male student who attempted to terminate an online relationship, which began when the young man was 17. They determine that D'Amato now lives on a substantial inheritance from his father, a successful lawyer. After considerable effort to locate him, they confront him on the street, to which he responds with additional legal threats. Before returning to New Zealand, Farrier contacts D'Amato's stepmother for comment; she implicitly confirms her stepson's "tickling" past, and Farrier informs her that he believes D'Amato is still involved in it.

Production

Under the working title Tickle King: The Hunt for the Truth in Competitive Tickling, Farrier and Reeve raised NZ$29,570 on Kickstarter in June 2014, intended primarily to cover the costs of the crew traveling to the United States for a week. The project also received funding from the New Zealand Film Commission.

The soundtrack includes music from Upstream Color by Shane Carruth.

Release
The film was screened at the January 2016 Sundance Film Festival, after which Magnolia Pictures picked up distribution and HBO picked up US TV rights. In March 2016 it was presented as part of the True/False Film Festival.

The film was released to New Zealand theaters on 27 May 2016. It was released by Magnolia Pictures to U.S. theaters on 17 June, and in Australia and the United Kingdom on 19 August.

Reception
Tickled has received critical acclaim. In a review headlined "fetish documentary goes from giggly to grim", Nigel Smith of The Guardian gives the movie four (of five) stars. Dennis Harvey of Variety states the onscreen presence of the filmmakers "is justified because the harassment they experience in pursuing the story becomes a big part of its narrative". The Salt Lake Tribune, giving it 4.5 stars, said it was "an act of journalistic courage" and that they "reveal the harm that can be done by an individual with a lot of money and a vindictive streak". Manohla Dargis of The New York Times, giving it a Critic's Pick, said "Farrier and Mr. Reeve see the humor, but they also see the pathos—because it's all fun and giggles until someone gets hurt." Darian Lusk of the New York Observer wrote, "The shocking truth is uncomfortably pursued to its fullest, and the result is a riveting piece of investigative journalism."

Armond White of Out magazine was critical of the movie, commenting that it "zips past its sexual aspects", and concluding that it is ultimately "frustrating, a blue-balls documentary".

At Rotten Tomatoes the film has an approval rating of 93% based on reviews from 106 critics. Metacritic gives the film a score of 76 out of 100, based on reviews from 28 critics, indicating "generally favorable" reviews.

Response from the documentary's subjects
After the premiere screening at Sundance, in March 2016, D'Amato filed a federal lawsuit against the filmmakers for making false accusations, including the implication that D'Amato used extortion and abused minors, and stating that D'Amato has no relationship with O'Brien Media. In response, Farrier told The Salt Lake Tribune that "given the number of hollow legal threats we faced during the making of it, it's almost refreshing to see a real case being filed by real lawyers."

In June 2016, Kevin Clarke of O'Brien Media created a website to counter the documentary.

D'Amato attended the 18 June 2016 screening at the Nuart Theater in Los Angeles, and confronted Dylan Reeve, saying, "You need to lawyer up. You need to get criminal counsel." Clarke argued with Reeve during a public question-and-answer session after the film, saying "The film is a piece of garbage full of lies. Release the audio tapes that show you're lying. And if you don't release it, it's the same as admitting you're lying."

D'Amato filed a $40 million defamation and slander lawsuit in Nassau County court alleging that his stepmother Dorothy D'Amato made statements in the film with the intention to injure his business, causing mental distress.

D'Amato died at age 55, on 13 March 2017. The filmmakers posted a statement on their web site that they were "incredibly sad" to learn of it, and asking that his death be treated with respect.

References

External links
 
 
 
 , follow-up special

New Zealand documentary films
Documentary films about same-sex sexuality
2016 documentary films
Tickling
2016 films
2016 LGBT-related films
2010s English-language films